Anthony Abraham Turner (7 February 1933 – 30 March 2021) was a diver who competed for England. He competed in two events at the 1952 Summer Olympics. Turner also represented England and won a silver medal in the 3 metres springboard at the 1954 British Empire and Commonwealth Games in Vancouver, Canada.

References

External links
 

1933 births
2021 deaths
English male divers
Commonwealth Games medallists in diving
Commonwealth Games silver medallists for England
Divers at the 1954 British Empire and Commonwealth Games
Olympic divers of Great Britain
Divers at the 1952 Summer Olympics
Place of birth missing
Medallists at the 1954 British Empire and Commonwealth Games